A roly-poly toy, round-bottomed doll, tilting doll, tumbler, wobbly man, or wobble doll is a round-bottomed toy, usually egg-shaped, that tends to right itself when pushed at an angle, and does this in seeming contradiction to how it should fall. The toy is typically hollow with a weight inside the bottom hemisphere. The placement of this weight is such that the toy has a center of mass below the center of the hemisphere, so that any tilting raises the center of mass. When such a toy is pushed over, it wobbles for a few moments while it seeks the upright orientation, which has an equilibrium at the minimum gravitational potential energy.

Different toy manufacturers and different cultures have produced different-looking roly-poly toys: the okiagari-koboshi (起き上がり小法師, "take a spill, get up, and arise") and some types of Daruma doll of Japan, the nevаlyashka (неваляшка, "untopply") or van'ka-vstan'ka (ванька-встанька, "Ivan-get-up") of Russia, and Playskool's Weebles. Such toys' self-righting characteristic has come to symbolize the ability to have success, overcome adversity, and recover from misfortune.

Traditional Chinese examples (called 不倒翁, bù dǎo wēng) are hollow clay figures of plump children, but "many Chinese folk artists shape their tumblers in the image of clownish mandarins as they appear on stage; in this way they mock the inefficiency and ineptitude of the bureaucrats".

Fisher-Price, a well known toy manufacturer, recommends roly-poly toys for small children just developing motor skills; a child can bat at it without its rolling away.

Dynamogene Theater stages a performance called "Monsieur Culbuto", allowing the audience to interact with a human dressed as a roly-poly toy.

The Noddy stories by Enid Blyton features the character Mr. Wobblyman, who is based on this type of toy.

One of the puppets/non-human presenters in the TV show Playbus (later Playdays) was a roly-poly clown called Wobble.

See also
Bobo doll experiment
Gömböc
Monostatic polytope

References

Traditional toys
Wooden toys
Toy figurines